is a Japanese former swimmer. He competed in the men's 200 metre breaststroke at the 1952 Summer Olympics.

References

External links
 

1934 births
Living people
Olympic swimmers of Japan
Swimmers at the 1952 Summer Olympics
Sportspeople from Hiroshima
Japanese male breaststroke swimmers